Mario Bellatin (born July 23, 1960, Mexico City, Mexico) is a Mexican-born Peruvian novelist.

Early life
Mario Bellatin was born in Mexico City to Peruvian parents. Soon after Mario was born, his parents returned to Lima. He spent two years studying theology at the seminary Santo Toribio de Mogrovejo and graduated from the University of Lima. In 1987, Bellatin moved to Cuba, where he studied screenplay writing at the International Film School Latinoamericana. On his return to Mexico in 1995, he became the director of the area of Literature and Humanities at the University of the Cloister of Sor Juana and became a member of the National System of Creators of Art from 1999 to 2005. He is currently the director of the Dynamic School of Writers in Mexico City.

Career
Mario Bellatin is celebrated as a leading voice in Spanish fiction for his experimental and fragmented writing, which artfully intertwines reality and creation.  His work is known in many parts of the world, with translations into English, German, French and Malayalam. However, while he has participated in writing workshops around the United States, his work is underrepresented in the English-speaking world.

As a result of a birth defect that left him missing much of his right arm, a good portion of his fiction concerns characters that are deformed or diseased or with an uncertain sexual identity.

Bellatin was quoted in The New York Times as saying, "To me literature is a game, a search for ways to break through borders. But in my work the rules of the game are always obvious, the guts are exposed, and you can see what is being cooked up.”

Awards and recognition
Bellatin is seen as a renewer in Peruvian literature. Alonso Cueto wrote of him: "There is a new generation of writers in Peru that wishes to break with the usual form of writing realistic novels. Iván Thays and Mario Bellatin are the masters of this group of young writers." He has received positive reviews from other writers. For instance Mario Vargas Llosa described him as "one of the most interesting writers that have arisen in Latin America in recent years."

Premio Xavier Villaurrutia for his novel Flores, 2000 
Guggenheim Fellowship, Latin American and Caribbean Fellow, 2002 
Premio Nacional de Literatura for El gran vidrio (The Great Glass), Instituto Municipal de Cultura, Turismo y Arte de Mazatlán, 2008 
Stonewall Book Award-Barbara Gittings Literature Award Honor for Beauty Salon, American Library Association, 2010 
Doctor Honoris Causa, 17, Institute of Critical Studies, 2019.

Selected works
Flores (Anagrama, 2004)
The Great Glass (Anagrama, 2007)
Chinese Checkers, trans. Cooper Renner (Ravenna Press, 2007) 
beauty parlor, trans. Ratheesh (DC Books, 2011) 
Beauty Salon, trans. Kurt Hollander (City Lights Publishers, 2009) 
Shiki Nagaoka: A Nose for Fiction, trans. David Shook (Phoneme Media , 2013) 
Jacob the Mutant, trans. Jacob Steinberg (Phoneme Media , 2015) 
The Uruguayan Book of the Dead, trans. David Shook (Phoneme Media, 2019)

See also
 Mexican people of Italian descent

References

External links
Bellatin in Molossus
Review of Beauty Salon
Review of Chinese Checkers
Larry Rohter. A Mischievous Novelist With an Eye and an Ear for the Unusual, New York Times, 2009-08-09; retrieved 2011-06-07

1960 births
Living people
Mexican novelists
Mexican male writers
Writers from Mexico City
Peruvian novelists
Peruvian male writers
Academic staff of the University of the Cloister of Sor Juana
Male novelists
University of Lima alumni
Mexican people of Italian descent